Leonard Webb may refer to:

 Leonard Webb (academic) (1920–2004), Australian ecologist and ethnobotanist
 Leonard Webb (veteran) (1921–2011), British World War II veteran